Austin High School (originally called Franklin School when constructed in 1869) is a public high school in Austin, Minnesota, United States. It is part of Austin Public Schools, established in 1857.  The home of the Packers, the school has over 1,250 students; AHS prides itself on having strong academics, athletics, and fine arts. The school colors are Scarlet and White, and the sports team is the Packers. AHS is a member of the Big 9 Conference.

School layout

The original (north) block and first addition (south block) are laid out in a fashion where the classrooms all have exterior windows. The only exception being what was the original south hall of the original (north) block which currently overlooks the commons area. The interior of the north block of the building houses the school's library/media center on the main floor and the original auditorium – named Christgau Hall – on the second and third floors. The interior of the south block / first addition houses Knowlton Auditorium and Over Berven gym. The basement of the south block/first addition is home to the school's cafeteria. The second addition which is located to the south of the main classroom blocks is home to the competition gymnasium, locker rooms, a wrestling mezzanine above the locker rooms, and another gym which has a composite-type floor and is used mainly for wrestling and gymnastics. Across Fourth Street to the west of the main building is the school's Annex building. It is home to industrial arts, child care, and music programs. It is connected to the main building via a tunnel under the street. The Annex basement contains the school's weight room and a small auditorium. The Annex recently received a second floor addition which houses the MacPhail Center for Music.

Sports available

Dance Team (Girls)
Cheer Team (Girls)
Gymnastics (Girls)
Softball (Girls)
Basketball (Boys/Girls)
Soccer (Boys/Girls)
Tennis (Boys/Girls)
Golf (Boys/Girls)
Wrestling (Boys/Girls)
Hockey (Boys/Girls)
Bowling (Boys/Girls)
Cross Country (Boys/Girls)
Track and Field (Boys/Girls)
Swimming/Diving (Boys/Girls)
Football (Boys)
Baseball (Boys)
Clay Target Shooting  (Co-ed)

Other information

Austin is a member of the Big Nine athletic and music conference. Austin High School is in the hometown of Hormel Foods Headquarters.  The population was 24,718 at the 2010 census.  "Spam Town USA," as Austin is sometimes called, is also home to the Spam Museum.  American Football coach and broadcaster John Madden and 2-time U.S. Open golf champion Lee Janzen were born in Austin.

Notable alumni
Grant Blackwood, novelist
Mark Cady, jurist for the Iowa Supreme Court
Burdette Haldorson, two-time Olympic Gold Medalist in men's basketball
Amanda Hocking, New York Times best-selling author
Molly Kate Kestner, professional singer-songwriter
John Maus, Avant-Garde synthpop musician
Bob Motzko, University of Minnesota head men's ice hockey coach
Warren Stowell, Minnesota state legislator, businessman, and educator
Michael Wuertz, former Major League Baseball pitcher, previously with the Chicago Cubs and with the Oakland A's
Rick Zombo, retired defenseman for 12 seasons in the National Hockey League

References

External links
Austin Public Schools website

Schools in Mower County, Minnesota
Educational institutions established in 1869
Public high schools in Minnesota
Buildings and structures in Austin, Minnesota
1869 establishments in Minnesota